Denise Bronzetti (born 12 December 1972) is a Sammarinese politician who previously served as a Captain Regent. She held the post from 1 October 2012 to 1 April 2013, with Teodoro Lonfernini. She was previously a member of the Grand and General Council.

References

1976 births
People from the City of San Marino
21st-century women politicians
Captains Regent of San Marino
Female heads of state
Living people
Members of the Grand and General Council
Party of Socialists and Democrats politicians
Sammarinese women in politics